Zarnaq is a placename in Iran. It may refer to:
 Zarnaq
 Zarnaq, Meyaneh
 Zarnaq, Tabriz
 Zarnaq, Khoda Afarin